Just Dance may refer to:

Just Dance (video game series), developed and published by Ubisoft                       
Just Dance (video game), the first game in the series, 2009
"Just Dance" (song), a 2008 song by Lady Gaga
"Just Dance", a 2017 song by Lala Hsu from The Inner Me
Just Dance, a 2023 album by Inna
Just Dance (Indian TV series), a 2011 Indian dance-reality series
Just Dance (South Korean TV series), a 2018 television series